Demi is a feminine given name and a surname. It may also refer to:

Fictional characters
 Demi (Phantasy Star IV), female android from the video game Phantasy Star IV
 Demi Miller, in the BBC soap opera EastEnders
 Demi the Demoness, an underground comic book character

Amounts
 demi (metric prefix) (or demi-), a former metric unit prefix not adopted by SI
 demi- (numerical prefix), a linguistic prefix representing half, see Numeral prefix
 "demi" (word), see List of Latin words with English derivatives
 "demi-" (medicine), see List of medical roots, suffixes and prefixes

Other uses
 Demi (album), by Demi Lovato
 Demi River, Gujarat, India
 Short for demisexual, a sexual orientation
 Short for demigender, a gender identity

See also
 
 
 Demy (disambiguation)